

Roger (Rog) Bollen (July 27, 1941 – October 3, 2015) was an American writer and illustrator of comic strips and children's books, and a producer of television shows for children.

Born in East Cleveland, he graduated from Shaw High School and Kent State University. During his final years, he lived in Chagrin Falls, OH. After suffering from a stroke and heart failure, he died in Hillcrest Hospital, Mayfield Heights, Ohio, on October 3, 2015. He was survived by his third wife Audrey Curran and his daughter Melissa Ellsworth.

Syndicated comic strips
From 1966 to 1980, Bollen drew a two-panel cartoon strip titled Funny Business (in 1975, it was changed into a one-panel cartoon). From 1967 to 1994, Bollen wrote and drew the comic strip Animal Crackers, his most successful feature which was translated into several languages. Bollen additionally drew the strip Catfish from 1973 to 1986.

Children's books
Together with his second wife Marilyn Sadler, Bollen produced more than 50 children's books. Their first book, Alistair's Elephant, was published in 1983. Other notable books are the P.J. Funnybunny series and Zenon: Girl of the 21st Century.

Television shows
Bollen and Sadler together wrote the CGI-animated children's television series Handy Manny, where they also served as executive producers.

References

External links 

 

1941 births
2015 deaths
American children's book illustrators
American comic strip cartoonists
American television producers
People from Ohio
People from Chagrin Falls, Ohio
Kent State University alumni